Isleham Priory Church, located in Isleham, Cambridgeshire, England, is a Benedictine alien priory built around 1100 AD. It is an important example of an early 12th century Norman church. Despite being converted into a barn after the Reformation, the building remains mostly in its original state. The church is designated a Grade I listed building. The structure and surrounding area are also designated a scheduled Ancient Monument.

Description
The Priory is located north of the village of Isleham in Cambridgehsire, England.
The Chapel of St Margaret of Antioch, converted to a barn at a later date, is the only surviving building in the priory complex. The site also includes the buried foundations of other priory buildings, as well as the earthwork remains of a medieval agricultural complex to the north of the church.

The church was built with local clunch rubble and limestone. The building is mostly unaltered  since 1100 AD, except for minor repairs done in the 13th and early 14th centuries and after the barn conversion in the 16th or 17th centuries. The area north of the chapel is enclosed by a clunch and brick wall, which was built later than the priory but represents the same boundary that previously enclosed the priory buildings. This enclosed area  may also contain the monks' cemetery. The chapel was converted to a barn after the Reformation. In the 16th or early 17th century, a large barn door with a brick round-headed arch replaced an earlier chapel door in the same location. The roofline is believed to have been raised a century later.

The north wall contains two original narrow slit windows, each with rounded heads. The south and west walls also contain the original narrow slit windows. The nave is separated from the chancel by a semicircular arch of two columns. The apse contains three windows, of which the only original window is on the east wall.

History
The Church of St Margaret of Antioch was given to the Benedictine Abbey of Saint-Jacut-de-la-Mer in Brittany, France around 1100 by Count Alan of Brittany or his successors and the Benedictines founded the alien priory on the site. In 1254 the monks moved to the sister cell at Linton, although the site seems to have been used as a priory after that time.

Due to the tensions of a French-owned monastery in England during the Hundred Years' War, the lands were seized by the King in 1414 and granted to the Master and Fellows of Pembroke College, Cambridge in 1440. In 1944 Pembroke College placed it in the guardianship of the Ministry of Works. It is a Grade I listed building. and now in the care of English Heritage. The foundations of the conventual buildings and the earthworks in the surrounding land were designated a scheduled monument in 1996.

See also
Scheduled monuments in Cambridgeshire
List of monastic houses in England

References

Isleham
English Heritage sites in Cambridgeshire
Alien priories in England
11th-century establishments in England
Monasteries in Cambridgeshire
Christian monasteries established in the 11th century
Scheduled monuments in Cambridgeshire
Grade I listed churches in Cambridgeshire
Priory Church